Hacılar (also, Gadzhilar and Gadzhylar) is a village and municipality in the Barda Rayon of Azerbaijan.  It has a population of 555.

References 

Populated places in Barda District